The Cathedral of St. Pantaleon or St. Panteleimon is a large Eastern Orthodox cathedral in the Kyivan neighbourhood of Feofaniia. It shares similarities with the Alexander Nevsky Cathedral, Tallinn and is considered a high point in Russian Revival ecclesiastical architecture.  

It was built to a Russian Revival design by Yevgeny Yermakov between 1905 and 1912. The building is pentacupolar, with the massive black central dome and the four tent-like domes on the corners, as well as low galleries which run continuously around the building. The outer walls are covered with a mazy web of tracery. 

The cathedral was intended to serve as the main church of the Kyivan Monastery of St. Panteleimon, which originated as a branch, or skete, of St. Michael's Golden-Domed Monastery. It was closed for worship and thoroughly looted in the 1920s and was damaged in World War II. 

The hollow shell of the church was returned to the Ukrainian Orthodox Church in 1990s and has been restored as the main church of a nunnery. The other church building of the convent conforms to the cathedral in style.

References 

Cathedrals in Kyiv
Eastern Orthodox cathedrals in Ukraine
Ukrainian Orthodox Church of the Kyivan Patriarchate cathedrals
20th-century Eastern Orthodox church buildings
Churches completed in 1905
Russian Revival architecture
Church buildings with domes
Holosiivskyi District
1905 establishments in the Russian Empire